Lentinan is a polysaccharide isolated from the fruit body of shiitake mushroom (Lentinula edodes mycelium).

Chemistry
Lentinan is a β-1,3 beta-glucan with β-1,6 branching. It has a molecular weight of 500,000 Da and specific rotation of +14-22° (NaOH).

Research

Preclinical studies
An in vitro experiment showed lentinan stimulated production of white blood cells in the human cell line U937. Lentinan is thought to be inactive in humans when given orally and is therefore administered intravenously. The authors of an in vivo study of lentinan suggested that the compound may be active when administered orally in mice.

Human clinical trials
Lentinan has been the subject of a limited number of clinical studies in cancer patients in Japan; however, evidence of efficacy is lacking.

Adverse effects
Lentinan has been reported to cause shiitake mushroom dermatitis.

See also
Medicinal mushrooms

References

External links 
 Lentinan effects (antitumor and others)
Memorial Sloan-Kettering Cancer Center's page for Lentinan.

Immunostimulants
Polysaccharides